Enaphalodes archboldi is a species of beetle in the family Cerambycidae. It was described by Lingafelter and Chemsak in 2002.

References

Elaphidiini
Beetles described in 2002